Frisco is an unincorporated community in Stoddard County, in the U.S. state of Missouri.

History
A post office called Frisco was established in 1895, and remained in operation until 1914. The community derives its name from the nickname of the St. Louis–San Francisco Railway.

References

Unincorporated communities in Stoddard County, Missouri
Unincorporated communities in Missouri
1895 establishments in Missouri